Bezirk Eferding is a district of the state of 
Upper Austria in Austria.

Municipalities 
Towns (Städte) are indicated in boldface; market towns (Marktgemeinden) in italics; suburbs, hamlets and other subdivisions of a municipality are indicated in small characters.
Alkoven
Aschach an der Donau
Eferding
Fraham
Haibach ob der Donau
Hartkirchen
Hinzenbach
Prambachkirchen
Pupping
Scharten
Sankt Marienkirchen an der Polsenz
Stroheim

External links 
 Official site

 
Districts of Upper Austria